Giovanni Battista Tiepolo (5 March 1696 – 27 March 1770), also known as Giambattista (or Gianbattista) Tiepolo, was an Italian painter and printmaker from the Republic of Venice who painted in the Rococo style, considered an important member of the 18th-century Venetian school. He was prolific, and worked not only in Italy, but also in Germany and Spain.

Giovan Battista Tiepolo, together with Giambattista Pittoni, Canaletto, Giovan Battista Piazzetta, Giuseppe Maria Crespi, and Francesco Guardi are considered the traditional Old Masters of that period.

Successful from the beginning of his career, he has been described by Michael Levey as "the greatest decorative painter of eighteenth-century Europe, as well as its most able craftsman."

Biography

Early life (1696–1726)
Born in Venice, he was the youngest of six children of Domenico and Orsetta Tiepolo. His father was a small shipping merchant who belonged to a family that bore the prestigious patrician name of Tiepolo without claiming any noble descent. Some of the children acquired noble godparents, and Giambattista was originally named after his godfather, a Venetian nobleman called Giovanni Battista Dorià. He was baptised on 16 April 1696 in the local church, San Pietro di Castello (then still officially the cathedral of Venice). His father died about a year later, leaving his mother to bring up a family of young children, presumably in somewhat difficult circumstances.

In  1710 he became a pupil of Gregorio Lazzarini, a successful painter with an eclectic style. He was, though, at least equally strongly influenced  by his study of the works of other contemporary artists such as Sebastiano Ricci and Giovanni Battista Piazzetta and those of his Venetian predecessors, especially Tintoretto and Veronese. A biography of his teacher, published in 1732, says that Tiepolo "departed from [Lazzarini's] studied manner of painting, and, all spirit and fire, embraced a quick and resolute style". His earliest known works are depictions of the apostles, painted in spandrels as part of the decoration of the church of the Ospedoletto in Venice in 1715–6. At about the same time he became painter to the Doge, Giovanni II Cornaro, and oversaw the hanging of pictures at his palace, as well as painting many works himself, of which only two portraits have been identified.  He painted his first fresco in 1716,  on the ceiling of a church at Biadene, near Treviso.   He probably left Lazzarini's studio in 1717, the year he  was received into the Fraglia or guild of painters.

In around 1719–20 he painted a scheme of frescoes for the wealthy, and recently ennobled, publisher Giambattista Baglione in the hall of  his villa at Massanzago near Padua. Tiepolo depicted the Triumph of Aurora on the ceiling, and the Myth of Phaethon on the walls, creating the kind of fluid spatial illusion which was to become a recurring theme in his work.

In 1722 he was one of twelve artists commissioned to contribute a painting on canvas of one of the apostles as part of a decorative scheme for the nave of San Stae in Venice. The other artists involved included Ricci, Piazetta, and Pellegrini.

Marriage and children
In 1719, Tiepolo married noblewoman Maria Cecilia Guardi, sister of two contemporary Venetian painters, Francesco and Giovanni Antonio Guardi. Tiepolo and his wife had nine children, of whom four daughters and three sons survived to adulthood. Two of his sons, Domenico and Lorenzo, painted with him as his assistants and later achieved some independent recognition, in particular Giovanni Domenico Tiepolo. His children painted figures with a design similar to that of their father, but with distinctive, including genre, styles. His third son became a priest. Fabio Canal, Francesco Lorenzi, and Domenico Pasquini were among his pupils.

Early mature work (1726–1750)

Some major commissions came from the patrician  Dolfin family. Dionisio Dolfin, the Archbishop of Udine in Friuli employed him to decorate a chapel in the cathedral at Udine, and then to paint another cycle depicting episodes from the lives of Abraham and his descendants from the Book of Genesis at his archiepiscopal palace (the "Arcivescovado")
(completed 1726–1728). Despite their elevated subject matter, they are bright in colour, and light-hearted in mood: Michael Levey describes the paintings at the palace  as "a shimmering set of tableaux, full of wit and elegance". Tiepolo used a much cooler palette than previous Venetian painters, in order to create a convincing effect of daylight.  His first masterpieces in Venice were a cycle of ten enormous canvases painted to decorate a large reception room of Ca' Dolfin on the Grand Canal of Venice (ca. 1726–1729), depicting  battles and triumphs from the history of ancient Rome.

These early masterpieces, innovative amongst Venetian frescoes for their luminosity, brought him many commissions. He painted canvases for churches such as that of Verolanuova (1735–1740), for the Scuola dei Carmini (1740–1747), in Cannaregio, a ceiling for the Palazzi Archinto and Casati-Dugnani in Milan (1731), the Colleoni Chapel in Bergamo (1732–1733), a ceiling for the Gesuati (Santa Maria del Rosario) in Venice of St. Dominic Instituting the Rosary (1737–1739), Palazzo Clerici, Milan (1740), decorations for Villa Cordellina Molin, a ceiling for the Chiesa degli Scalzi (1743–1744); now destroyed (reconstitution :), Villa Cordellina, at Montecchio Maggiore (1743–1744) and for the ballroom of the Palazzo Labia in Venice (now a television studio), showing the Story of Cleopatra (1745–1750).

Etchings
Tiepolo produced two sets of etchings, the Capricci (c. 1740–1742) and the Scherzi di  fantasia (c. 1743–1757). The ten capricci were first published by Anton Maria Zanetti, incorporated into the third edition of a compilation of woodcuts after Parmigiano. They were not published separately until 1785. The subject matter is often bizarre and fantastical, and the works owe a lot to the example of Salvator Rosa and Giovanni Benedetto Castiglione. The 23 Scherzi were etched over more than ten years and privately circulated, only being commercially published after Tiepolo's death, with numbers and titles added by his son, Giandomenico. Subjects include  mysterious Eastern figures, and, in  some of the later prints, scenes of necromancy.

Würzburg Residenz (1750–1753)

By 1750, Tiepolo's reputation was firmly established throughout Europe, with the help of his friend Francesco Algarotti, an art dealer, critic and collector. That year, at the behest of Prince Bishop Karl Philip von Greiffenklau, he traveled to Würzburg where he arrived in November 1750. He remained there for three years during which he executed ceiling paintings in the New Residenz palace (completed 1744). He frescoed the Kaisersaal salon in collaboration with his sons Giandomenico and Lorenzo and was then invited to deliver a design for the grandiose entrance staircase (Treppenhaus) designed by Balthasar Neumann. His Allegory of the Planets and Continents depicts Apollo embarking on his daily course; deities around him symbolize the planets; allegorical figures (on the cornice) represent the four continents. He included several portraits in the Europe section of this fresco, including a self-portrait; one of his son Giandomenico; one of the prince-bishop von Greiffenklau; one of the painter Antonio Bossi; and one of the architect, Balthasar Neumann.

Return to Venice and the Veneto (1753–1770)

Tiepolo returned to Venice in 1753. He  was now in demand locally, as well as abroad where he was elected President of the Academy of Padua. He went on to complete theatrical frescoes for churches; the Triumph of Faith for the Chiesa della Pietà; panel frescos for Ca' Rezzonico (which now also houses his ceiling fresco from the Palazzo Barbarigo); and paintings for patrician villas in the Venetian countryside, such as Villa Valmarana in Vicenza and an elaborate panegyric ceiling for the Villa Pisani in Stra.

In some  celebrated frescoes at the Palazzo Labia, he depicted two scenes from the life of Cleopatra: Meeting of Anthony and Cleopatra and Banquet of Cleopatra, as well as, in a central ceiling fresco, the Triumph of Bellerophon over Time. Here he  collaborated with  Girolamo Mengozzi Colonna. This connection with Colonna, who also designed sets for opera, highlights the increasing tendency towards composition as a staged fiction in Tiepolo's frescoes. The architecture of the Banquet fresco  also recalls that of  Veronese's Wedding at Cana. In 1757, he painted an altar piece for the Thiene family, representing the apotheosis of Saint Cajetan. It is in the church of hamlet of Rampazzo in the Camisano Vicentino.

Madrid

In 1761, Charles III commissioned Tiepolo to create a ceiling fresco to decorate the throne room of the Royal Palace of Madrid. The panegyric theme is the Apotheosis of Spain and has allegorical depictions recalling the dominance of Spain in the Americas and across the globe.

He also painted two other ceilings in the palace, and carried out many private commissions in Spain. However he suffered from  the jealousy and the bitter opposition of the rising champion of Neoclassicism, Anton Raphael Mengs; at the instigation of Mengs' supporter, the King's confessor Joaquim de Electa, had Tiepolo's series of canvases for the church of S. Pascual at Aranjuez replaced by works by his favourite.

Tiepolo died in Madrid on 27 March 1770. He is buried in Madonna dell'Orto in Venice

After his death, the rise of a stern Neoclassicism and the post-revolutionary decline of absolutism led to the slow decline of the Rococo style associated with his name, but failed to dent his reputation. In 1772, Tiepolo's son was sufficiently respected to be  painter to Doge Giovanni II Cornaro, in charge of the decoration of Palazzo Mocenigo in the sestiere of San Polo, Venice.

Gallery

List of works

Paintings before 1740

Works from 1740–1750

Works after 1750

References

Sources

Further reading

Aldo Rizzi, Il Tiepolo all'Arcivescovado di Udine, Milano 1965.
Aldo Rizzi, Tiepolo a Udine, Milano 1969.
Aldo Rizzi, le acqueforti dei Tiepolo, Milano, 1970.
Aldo Rizzi, La grafica del Tiepolo: le acqueforti, Milano 1971.
Aldo Rizzi, La mostra del Tiepolo, Milano 1971.
Aldo Rizzi, Giambattista Tiepolo, Milano 1990.
Aldo Rizzi, I Tiepolo a Udine, Milano 1996.
Adelheid M. Gealt and George Knox, Domenico Tiepolo: A New Testament, Bloomington, IN, Indiana UP, 2006.
Christiansen, Keith. Giambattista Tiepolo, 1696–1770, New York: Metropolitan Museum of Art, 1996. .
Boorsch, Suzanne. Venetian prints and books in the age of Tiepolo, New York: Metropolitan Museum of Art, 1997. .

External links

Udine, IT, Tiepolo's city
Many works by Tiepolo
Works in Udine 
Short biography
Illustrated biography and discussion of famous works
Aldo Rizzi
References to Giambattista Tiepolo in European historic newspapers

1696 births
1770 deaths
18th-century Italian painters
Italian male painters
Italian printmakers
Italian Baroque painters
Rococo painters
18th-century Venetian people
Academic staff of the Accademia di Belle Arti di Venezia
Catholic painters
Catholic etchers
18th-century Italian male artists